Zygaena viciae, the New Forest burnet moth,  is a member of the Zygaenidae family, found in the northern hemisphere. Since 1927 it has been extinct in the New Forest, England, after which it is named. It is also known in Europe as the small five-spotted ram.

Distribution and habitat
The moth is found in southern and central Europe, and in Scotland (Z. v. argylliensis), where it survives in very small numbers. It is also found in southern Scandinavia. In the east, the range extends to Lake Baikal.

Life cycle and behaviour
Pale green/yellow eggs are laid in clusters. The larvae feed on the leaves of clover and vetch species. Their appearance varies with region, but they are generally green, with yellow and black spots. They pupate within a cocoon attached to foliage. The adults' wingspan is 22–32 mm, they fly by day, and they are on wing in July.

Subspecies
Zygaena viciae viciae
Zygaena viciae argyllensis  Tremewan, 1967
Zygaena viciae bosniensis  Reiss, 1922
Zygaena viciae charon  Hübner, 1796
Zygaena viciae dacica  Burgeff, 1914
Zygaena viciae ehnbergii  Reuter, 1893
Zygaena viciae fernandezi  Gomez Bustillo & Fernandez-Rubio, 1976
Zygaena viciae hulda  Reiss & Reiss, 1972
Zygaena viciae italica  Caradja, 1895
Zygaena viciae nigrescens  Reiss, 1921
Zygaena viciae nobilis  Navas, 1924
Zygaena viciae rhaetica  Burgeff, 1926
Zygaena viciae sicula  Calberla, 1895
Zygaena viciae silbernageli  Reiss, 1943
Zygaena viciae silenus  Burgeff, 1926
Zygaena viciae stentzii  Freyer, 1839
Zygaena viciae subglocknerica  Reiss, 1943
Zygaena viciae ytenensis  Briggs, 1888

References

External links

 Lepiforum e. V.
 schmetterling-raupe
 Moths and Butterflies of Europe and North Africa
 Ian Kimber: Guide to the moths of Great Britain and Ireland

Zygaena
Moths of Europe
Moths described in 1775